Diya is a feminine given name and a surname. It is derived from the Sanskrit word ‘diyam’ which means ‘light’ or ‘lamp’. The name Diya symbolizes enlightenment, knowledge, and wisdom. It is also associated with the Hindu goddess of knowledge, Saraswati.

Notable people with the name are as follows:

Given name
Diya (actress) or Diya Sharma (born 1985), Indian actress
Diya Beeltah (born 1988), Mauritian model 
Diya Kumari (born 1971), Indian politician
Diya Siddique (born 2004), Bangladeshi archer

Surname
Oladipo Diya (born 1944), Nigerian general

References

Indian feminine given names
Bangladeshi feminine given names